Vojislav Stojanović (born April 14, 1997) is a Serbian professional basketball player for Stings Mantova of the Italian Serie A2, second tier national competition.

Professional career
Vojislav grew up with Crvena zvezda youth teams. He was the most valuable player of the 2014 Euroleague NIJT Final 8, contributing to winning the trophy with the averages of 13.5 points, 6.3 rebounds and 4.8 assists over four games.

On August 2, 2018, Stojanović signed a three-year deal with the Italian club Auxilium Torino. However, on November 24, 2018, he parted ways with Torino. Stojanović never played a single minute with the team. Coach Larry Brown never saw him as a part of the rotations and put him outside of the active roster. Two days later, he signed a three-year deal with Vanoli Cremona.

After being free agent for almost all the 2020-21, he was signed by Fortitudo Bologna one match before the end of the season.

On July 9, 2021, Stojanović signed for Stings Mantova in the Serie A2, second tier Italian national competition.

References

External links
 Vojislav Stojanović at draftexpress.com
 Vojislav Stojanović at eurobasket.com
 Vojislav Stojanović at euroleague.net

1997 births
Living people
Basketball players from Belgrade
Fortitudo Pallacanestro Bologna players
KK Crvena zvezda players
KK FMP players
Lega Basket Serie A players
Orlandina Basket players
Serbian expatriate basketball people in Italy
Serbian men's basketball players
Shooting guards
Small forwards
Vanoli Cremona players